The 57th Baeksang Arts Awards ceremony, organised by Ilgan Sports and JTBC Plus, was held on May 13, 2021, at KINTEX, Ilsanseo-gu, Gyeonggi Province, beginning at 9:00 p.m. KST. It was hosted by Shin Dong-yup and Bae Suzy, and was broadcast live in South Korea by JTBC and internationally by TikTok. The event was held with no on-site audience, due to COVID-19 pandemic in South Korea. The annual awards ceremony is one of South Korea's most prestigious award shows, recognizing excellence in film, television, and theatre.

The nominees for the 57th Baeksang Arts Awards were announced on April 12, 2021, through its official website. All works released between May 1, 2020, and April 11, 2021, were eligible for nominations. The final candidates for Grand Prize – Television were variety performer Yoo Jae-suk and drama series Beyond Evil.

The highest honors of the night, Grand Prize (Daesang), were awarded to director Lee Joon-ik of The Book of Fish in the film division and variety performer Yoo Jae-suk in the television division. With three wins, Beyond Evil won the most awards at the ceremony, including the Best Drama, while, It's Okay to Not Be Okay won two awards. In the film division, Voice of Silence and Moving On won two awards each, while with one win, Samjin Company English Class was awarded as the Best Film.

Winners and nominees 

Winners are listed first, highlighted in boldface, and indicated with a double dagger.
Nominees

Film

Films with multiple wins 
The following films received multiple wins:

Films with multiple nominations 
The following films received multiple nominations:

Television

Television programs with multiple wins 
The following television programs received multiple wins:

Television programs with multiple nominations 
The following television programs received multiple nominations:

Theatre

Special awards

Presenters and performers 
The following individuals, listed in order of appearance, presented awards or performed musical numbers.

Presenters

Performers

Notes

References

External links 
  

Baeksang
Baeksang
Baeksang Arts Awards
Baek
Baek
2021 in South Korea
Impact of the COVID-19 pandemic on cinema
Impact of the COVID-19 pandemic on television